The 2017–18 Auburn Tigers women's basketball team represent Auburn University during the 2017–18 NCAA Division I women's basketball season. The Tigers, led by sixth-year head coach Terri Williams-Flournoy, play their home games at Auburn Arena as members of the Southeastern Conference. They finished the season 14–15, 5–11 in SEC play to finish in tenth place. They lost in the second round of the SEC women's tournament to Tennessee.

Roster

Schedule

|-
!colspan=9 style="background:#172240; color:#FE3300;"| Non-conference regular season

|-
!colspan=9 style="background:#172240; color:#FE3300;"| SEC regular season

|-
!colspan=9 style="background:#172240; color:#FE3300;"| SEC Women's Tournament

Rankings
2017–18 NCAA Division I women's basketball rankings

See also
 2017–18 Auburn Tigers men's basketball team

References

Auburn Tigers women's basketball seasons
Auburn
Auburn Tigers women's basketball
Auburn Tigers women's basketball